Hyalinobatrachium bergeri is a species of frog in the family Centrolenidae.

Its natural habitats are lowland to upland primary and slightly disturbed forests, including could forests. It is an arboreal species associated with streams and edges of large rivers. Localized climate change and chytridiomycosis are potential threats.

References

bergeri
Amphibians of the Andes
Amphibians of Bolivia
Amphibians of Peru
Amphibians described in 1980
Taxonomy articles created by Polbot